In music, an augmented sixth is an interval produced by widening a major sixth by a chromatic semitone. For instance, the interval from C to A is a major sixth, nine semitones wide, and both the intervals from C to A, and from C to A are augmented sixths, spanning ten semitones. Being augmented, it is considered a dissonant interval.

Its inversion is the diminished third, and its enharmonic equivalent is the minor seventh.

In septimal meantone temperament, it is specifically equivalent to the harmonic seventh (a just interval of 7:4). In the tuning system known as equal temperament the augmented sixth is equal to ten semitones and is a dissonant interval.

The augmented sixth is relatively rare. Its most common occurrence is built on the lowered submediant of the prevailing key, in which position the interval assumes a natural tendency to resolve by expanding to an octave built on the dominant tonal degree. In its most common and expected resolution, the lower note of the interval moves downwards by a minor second to the dominant while the upper note, being chromatically inflected, is heard as the leading note of the dominant key, rising naturally by a minor second.
It is the strong tendency to resolve in this way that properly identifies this interval as being an augmented sixth rather than its more common enharmonic equivalent: the minor seventh, which has a tendency to resolve inwardly.

As the augmented sixth is correctly named only in certain specific contexts, the notational distinction between it and the minor seventh is often ignored. Regardless of the true diatonic context, many writers are instead in favor of the more familiar minor seventh – especially in chord notation, in which chords containing it are always labeled seventh chords.

The augmented sixth interval in combination with certain other intervals forms the group of chords known collectively as augmented sixth chords.

The just augmented sixth arises in the extended C major scale between A and F.

See also
 Augmented sixth chord
 List of meantone intervals

References

Further reading
Hewitt, Michael (2000). The Tonal Phoenix: A Study of Tonal Progression Through the Prime Numbers Three, Five and Seven. Orpheus-Verlag. 

Augmented intervals
Sixths (music)